Veronica Mihailov-Moraru (born 28 September 1982) is a Moldovan lawyer. She is currently serving as the Minister of Justice of Moldova in the Recean Cabinet.

References 

1982 births
Living people
Moldovan Ministers of Justice
Moldovan lawyers
Women government ministers of Moldova
21st-century Moldovan politicians
21st-century Moldovan women politicians
Moldova State University alumni